Peter John Lee (born January 2, 1956) is an English-born Canadian professional ice hockey manager and former professional ice hockey player. He played 431 National Hockey League games with the Pittsburgh Penguins. Lee has been serving as CEO of Eisbären Berlin of Germany's Deutsche Eishockey Liga since 2005.

Early life
Lee was born in Ellesmere, England, United Kingdom, and raised in Arvida, Quebec. As a youth, he learned to skate on the outdoor surface of Arvida's Powell Park, and later played for that town's Pee-Wee Orioles minor ice hockey. He played in the 1967, 1968 and 1969 Quebec International Pee-Wee Hockey Tournaments with the Orioles. The family moved to Ottawa in his mid-teen years.

Playing career
Lee was recruited along with his brother David by the Ottawa 67's of the Ontario Hockey League (OHL). He enjoyed a stellar junior career with the Ottawa 67's, where he became one of the few junior players to record more than 400 career points. He was awarded CHL Player of the Year in 1975–76. He set the OHL career scoring record with 213 career goals—a record that lasted for 33 years, until March 8, 2009, when John Tavares scored his 214th to surpass Lee.

After setting a new league record with 81 goals in 1975–76, Lee was chosen in the first round of the 1976 NHL Entry Draft (12th overall) by the Montreal Canadiens. Though he would spend two seasons with their farm team, the Nova Scotia Voyageurs, Lee never played for the Canadiens. On November 29, 1977, Montreal traded Lee, along with Peter Mahovlich, to the Pittsburgh Penguins in exchange for emerging star Pierre Larouche and the rights to forward Peter Marsh.

Lee was a fine offensive addition to the Pens and was a key playmaker on the powerplay. He reached the 30-goal mark twice and scored a personal best 64 points in 1980–81 playing on a line with Greg Malone and Rod Schutt. Unfortunately, the Penguins were not a successful team at that time, and Lee only played 19 playoff games during his five and a half years with the organization. He finished his NHL career with 245 points in 431 games.

Following the 1982–83 season, Lee left North America to play for Düsseldorfer EG of Germany. He scored 340 goals in 450 matches with the club before retiring in 1997.

Lee was inducted into the German Ice Hockey Hall of Fame in 2008.

Coaching and managing career
Lee replaced legendary coach Brian Kilrea behind the Ottawa 67's bench in 1994–95, but a dismal performance by the team prompted Kilrea to return and replace him for the 1995–96 campaign. He would return to Germany the following season and briefly resurrected his playing career.

Lee served as head coach of Eisbären Berlin from December 1997 until January 2000. He then was the manager of the club and got promoted to CEO in 2005. In 2008 and 2010 he received "Eishockey News DEL Manager of the Year" honors. During the 2006 Olympic Games in Torino, Lee served as an assistant coach of the Swiss National Team.

Family
He is the son of professional soccer player Eric Lee who competed for Great Britain at the 1948 Summer Olympics and a cousin of comedian Bob Mills

Career statistics

See also
List of National Hockey League players from the United Kingdom

References

External links

1956 births
Living people
Anglophone Quebec people
Baltimore Skipjacks players
Canadian ice hockey right wingers
Düsseldorfer EG players
Eisbären Berlin players
English emigrants to Canada
English ice hockey players
Ice hockey people from Quebec
Montreal Canadiens draft picks
National Hockey League first-round draft picks
Nova Scotia Voyageurs players
Ottawa 67's coaches
Ottawa 67's players
People from Ellesmere, Shropshire
Pittsburgh Penguins players
Ice hockey people from Ottawa
Sportspeople from Saguenay, Quebec
Toronto Toros draft picks
Canadian ice hockey coaches